Civic Light Opera (CLO) may refer to:

 Los Angeles Civic Light Opera (LACLO)
 Pittsburgh Civic Light Opera (PCLO)
 San Jose Civic Light Opera (SJCLO)
 Santa Barbara Civic Light Opera (SBCLO)